Retriever Activities Center is a 4,024-seat multi-purpose arena in Catonsville, Maryland. The arena opened in 1973. It was home to the UMBC Retrievers basketball and volleyball teams, which represent the University of Maryland, Baltimore County in NCAA Division I athletics, from its opening until the larger Chesapeake Employers Insurance Arena opened on campus in February 2018. It hosted the 2008 America East Conference men's basketball tournament final.

Background
The Retriever Activities Center (RAC) has numerous purposes for UMBC, both for athletics and student life. The aforementioned UMBC Event Center, located at the intersection of Hilltop Circle and Commons Drive, adjacent to Giffen Hill, replaced the RAC for various activities including varsity basketball and volleyball games, student-athlete health, student events, and commencement ceremonies.

The RAC includes:
UMBC Aquatic Complex, a state-of-the-art swimming pool complex (indoor and outdoor), as well as locker rooms and showers.
RAC Arena, formerly the university's main arena; previously used for basketball and volleyball games and commencement ceremonies, and still used for other events.
RAC Gymnasium, the student gym complex includes a weight room, cardio balcony, and fitness studio.
Arena Track, an indoor track encircling the main arena used for running and jogging.
Outdoor Tennis Courts,  located behind the RAC, the Outdoor Tennis Courts offer an additional amenity to the center.

See also
 List of NCAA Division I basketball arenas

References

External links
UMBC Retrievers Facilities

Catonsville, Maryland
Defunct college basketball venues in the United States
Basketball venues in Maryland
Sports venues in the Baltimore metropolitan area
UMBC Retrievers men's basketball
1973 establishments in Maryland
Sports venues completed in 1973
College volleyball venues in the United States
Continental Basketball Association venues